Cataonia mauritanica is a moth in the family Crambidae. It was described by Hans Georg Amsel in 1953. It is found in Mauritania.

References

Moths described in 1953
Odontiini
Taxa named by Hans Georg Amsel